The Russo-Turkish War of 1735–1739 between Russia and the Ottoman Empire was caused by the Ottoman Empire's war with Persia and continuing raids by the Crimean Tatars. The war also represented Russia's continuing struggle for access to the Black Sea. In 1737, the Habsburg monarchy joined the war on Russia's side, known in historiography as the Austro-Turkish War of 1737–1739.

Russian diplomacy before the war
By the outbreak of the Russo-Turkish war, Russia had managed to secure a favorable international situation by signing treaties with the Persian Empire in 1732–1735 (which was at war with the Ottoman Empire in 1730–1735) and supporting the accession to the Polish throne of Augustus III in 1735 instead of the French protégé Stanislaw Leszczynski, nominated by pro-Turkish France. Austria had been Russia's ally since 1726.

The course of the war in 1735–1738
The casus belli were the raids of the Crimean Tatars on Cossack Hetmanate in the end of 1735 and the Crimean Khan's military campaign in the Caucasus. In 1736, the Russian commanders envisioned the seizure of Azov and the Crimean Peninsula.

In 1735, on the eve of the war, the Russians made peace with Persia, giving back all the remaining territory conquered during the Russo-Persian War (Treaty of Ganja).

On 20 May 1736, the Russian Dnieper Army (62,000 men) under the command of Field Marshal Burkhard Christoph von Münnich took by storm the Crimean fortifications at Perekop and occupied Bakhchysarai on June 17. Crimean khans failed to defend their territory and repel the invasion, and in 1736, 1737 and 1738 Russian expeditionary armies broke through their defensive positions, pushing deep into the Crimean peninsula, driving the Tatar noblemen into the hills and forcing Khan Fet’ih Girey to take refuge at sea. They burned Gozlev, Karasubazar, the khan's palace in the Crimean capital, Bakhchysarai, and captured the Ottoman fortress at Azov. Khans Kaplan Girey and Fat’ih Girey were deposed by the Ottoman sultan for their incompetence. However, 1737 to 1739 were notable plague years and all sides of the conflict were crippled by disease and unsanitary conditions. Despite his success and a string of battlefield victories, the outbreak of an epidemic coupled with short supplies forced Münnich to retreat to Ukraine. On 19 June, the Russian Don Army (28,000 men) under the command of General Peter Lacy with the support from the Don Flotilla under the command of Vice Admiral Peter Bredahl seized the fortress of Azov. In July 1737, Münnich's army took by storm the Turkish fortress of Ochakov. Lacy's army (already 40,000 men strong) marched into the Crimea the same month and captured Karasubazar. However, Lacy and his troops had to leave the Crimea due to lack of supplies. The Crimean campaign of 1736 ended in Russian withdrawal into Ukraine, after an estimated 30,000 losses, only 2,000 of which were lost to war-related causes and the rest to disease, hunger and famine.

In July 1737, the Habsburg monarchy entered the war against the Ottoman Empire, but was defeated a number of times, amongst others in the Battle of Banja Luka on 4 August 1737, Battle of Grocka at 18, 21–22 July 1739, and then lost Belgrade after an Ottoman siege from 18 July to September 1739. In August, Russia, Austria and Ottoman Empire began negotiations in Nemirov, which would turn out to be fruitless. There were no significant military operations in 1738. The Russian Army had to leave Ochakov and Kinburn due to the plague outbreak.

According to an Ottoman Muslim account of the war translated into English by C. Fraser, Bosnian Muslim women fought in battle since they "acquired the courage of heroes" against the Austrian Germans at the siege of Osterwitch-atyk (Östroviç-i âtık) fortress. Women also fought in the defense of the fortresses of Būzin (Büzin) and Chetin (Çetin). Their bravery was described in a French account, too. Yeni Pazar, Izvornik, Gradişka, and Banaluka were also struck by the Austrians.

The final stage of the war
In 1739, the Russian army, commanded by Field Marshal Münnich, crossed the Dnieper, defeated the Turks at Stavuchany and occupied the fortress of Khotyn (August 19) and Iaşi. However, Austria was defeated by the Turks at Grocka and signed a separate treaty in Belgrade with the Ottoman Empire on 21 August, probably being alarmed at the prospect of Russian military success. This, coupled with the imminent threat of a Swedish invasion, and Ottoman alliances with Prussia, Poland and Sweden, forced Russia to sign the Treaty of Niš with Turkey on 29 September, which ended the war. The peace treaty granted Azov to Russia and consolidated Russia's control over the Zaporizhia.

For Austria, the war proved a stunning defeat. The Russian forces were much more successful on the field, but they lost tens of thousands to disease. The loss and desertion figures for the Ottomans are impossible to estimate.

Military details
This section summarizes Davies and Amin in sources.

Geography

The Ottoman Empire held forts along the north shore of the Black Sea and on the eastern side of the Balkans. Azov kept the Don Cossacks out of the Sea of Azov. Kaffa dominated the Crimean Khanate. Or Kapi behind the Perekop trenches guarded the entrance to Crimea. Ochakov at the mouth of the Dnieper kept the Dnieper Cossacks out of the Black Sea. Khotyn on the upper Dniester watched the Polish Commonwealth. The Turkish border was close to the current Ukrainian border along the Dniester. Polish claims extended to the Dnieper except for Kiev. Russia had a very vague border about 100 or more miles south of the current border. The semi-independent Zaporozhian Cossacks were along the Dnieper bend. The Crimean Khanate and its Nogai steppe allies raided Poland and Russia and sold the captives to the Turks at Kaffa.

Before 1735
In 1722 Russia and Turkey took advantage of Persian weakness to capture the northwest part of the Persian empire. Russia took the west side of the Caspian and the Ottomans got as far as Tabriz. Nader Shah slowly restored Persian power. By 1734 Persia was reconquering its land south of the Caucasus and it was clear that Russia could not hold its gains. In 1733 or 1734 the Turks ordered Crimea to send a force across the north Caucasus to attack the Persians. Eropkin on the Terek River tried to stop him and lost 55 men. The army went down the west shore of the Caspian as far as the Samur River, where it was recalled by Turkey for unexplained reasons.

1735: War starts
In 1735 the Crimean khan led 80000 men across the North Caucasus and south to Derbent. At the end of 1735 he heard of Leontev’s raid on Crimea and turned back. He spent time foraging in Kabardia and reached Crimea in the spring of 1736. Crimean interference in the Caucasus was one pretext for the war.

In March 1735, by the Treaty of Ganja, Russia returned its gains to Persia and allied with Persia against Turkey. With Crimean troops away from the peninsula and the Turks tied down with Persia, Russia now had the opportunity for a surprise attack. General Münnich went south and found that his army would not be ready until next year. In order not to waste that year’s campaigning season he sent Leontev on a raid.

1735:Leontev's raid: Leontev set off on 1 October 1735, far too late in the season. He started near the Samara River and marched south, east of the Dnieper bend. At Konska Voda he killed about 1000 Nogais and stole their livestock. He turned west with the river and on 16 October reached the Russian fort of Kamenny Zaton about 10 days march from Perekop.  Here he turned back because of the cold and the loss of 3000 horses. The next day a snowstorm killed another 1000 horses. By late November he was back where he started, having lost 9000 of his 40000 men and about 9000 horses.

1736: 1st Crimea, Azov, Kinburn
1736: Azov captured: Around 30 March 1736, Münnich and 5000 men besieged Azov. More soldiers arrived and on 7 April Muennich left to join the main force on the Dnieper. In May Peter Lacy took over and on 26 June the Turks surrendered on condition of safe passage. Lacy set off for Crimea, but turned back when he heard of Muennich's withdrawal.

1736: First Russian invasion of Crimea: In mid-April Muennich set off south with 54000 men and 8000 or 9000 carts following Leontiev’s route east of the Dnieper bend. On 4 May the Tatars were defeated at the Bela Zirka river near Kamenny Zaton and withdrew to Perekop. By 19 May Russia had 30000 troops facing Perekop. On 20 May the wall was breeched and on 22 May the 2254 Turks in the Or Qapi fort surrendered on parole.

Russia now entered Crimea for the first time.  On 5 June they raided Gozleve for supplies. On 17 June  they captured Bakhchisarai. The khan’s palace was burned, either accidentally or deliberately.  On 23 june they burned the kalga’s seat at Ak Mechet. Most of the Crimean army had scattered to the hills while the Turks withdrew to Kaffa.  Muennich hoped to capture Kaffa before the Turks could send re-enforcements, but on 25 June he decided to withdraw. Dysentery had first been noted on 7 June. Soon a third of the army was sick and many of the rest weakened. There was not enough food, fresh water or fodder to support his army. By 18 July they were back on the Samara River.  Half of the army had been lost, 2000 by fighting and the rest from disease. Because of the invasion Crimean khan Qaplan I Giray was replaced by Fetih II Giray.

1736: Kinburn captured: After Perekop was captured, Leontev and 13000 men were sent west to capture the fort on the Kinburn Spit south of Ochakov. The garrison was allowed to abandon the fort and cross to Ochakov on the opposite bank. 250 Russian prisoners there were freed.

1737: 2nd Crimea, Ochakov
On 9 January 1737 Austria joined the war drawing Turkish troops away from the Black Sea. The Turko-Persian conflict had ended in September 1736, but it took time to move Turkish troops west. The plan for 1737 was for one army to capture the Turkish fort of Ochakov at the mouth of the Dnieper-Bug estuary while a second army invaded Crimea.

1737:Capture of Ochakov: In early April Mǔnnich left the Kiev area with about 70000 men. On 30 June they reached Ochakov which now had 20000 defenders. Fighting began the next day and on 3 July heated shot set the town on fire. The fire spread to the powder magazine which blew up killing thousands of Turks. This caused the Turks to surrender the same day.

Muennich left 8000 men to hold the fort and returned with the rest of the army to Poltava. In October the Ottomans tried to retake the fort. All of their attempts failed and on 30 October they withdrew. (Next spring plague appeared in the fort and was reported in Moldavia, Wallachia, Poland and Zaporozhia. It increased and in September 1738 Ochakov and Kinburn were evacuated to escape the plague and because the weakened troops would not be able to resist if the Turks came back.)

1737: Second invasion of Crimea: The goal was to prevent the Crimeans from supporting Ochakov, damage Crimea as much as possible and capture the Turkish fort of Kaffa if possible. On 3 May 1737 Peter Lacy set out from the Mius River near Taganrog, about 50km west of Azov. Around 320 small boats with supplies and Don Cossacks followed along the coast. On 23 May the two forces joined at what is now Mariupol about 100km further west. On 28 June a Turkish fleet caught the Azov flotilla near Henichesk. After two gun duels they were driven off (1 July). Soon after a storm destroyed most of the flotilla along with its food and ammunition.

Instead of attacking the 60000 Tatars waiting at Perekop Lacy built a pontoon bridge out of water casks and crossed the Henichesk Strait onto the Arabat Spit starting on 2 July. Khan Fetih headed south toward the far end of the spit, but Lacy again outflanked him by crossing to the mainland near the Salhyr River, causing the Crimeans to disperse.  Lacy went southwest and on 14 July burned Karasubazar.Three days later he chose to withdraw. He had lost most of his supplies with the flotilla, the Tatars were regrouping, there was not enough fresh water and fodder, and sickness was starting to appear. On 23 July he crossed the Henichesk Strait and a month later reached "Molochnye Vody". Because of the invasion the Turks replaced Khan Fetih II with Mengli II.

1738: 3rd Crimea, western campaign
Planning started in November 1737. The goal for 1738 was to tie down the Crimeans while Münnich attacked along the Dniester to support the Austrians.

1738: Third invasion of Crimea: Peter Lacy started from Vol’chye Vody (location?) with an army about the same size as the previous year. On 19 May he met the supply fleet at what is now Berdiansk on the Azov coast (see Azov fleet below). Lacy learned that Mengli and 30000 men were waiting behind Perekop and that Turkish troops had garrisoned Or Kapi. They rested at Molochnye Vody. Instead of attacking Perekop, Lacy chose to cross the Sivash by wading at low tide, possibly near the Chongar Strait. They turned west and got between Perekop and the khan’s army. They blasted Or Kapi with mortars  which surrendered around the beginning of July. They turned south, but on 6 July they decided to go home. There was little food or fodder because the Crimean interior had been trashed the previous year, supplies with the Azov fleet had been lost (below), and disease was beginning to appear.  They stopped a Tatar attack on 9 July, rested at Perekop for a month, ruined Perekop as much as they could and returned to Molochnye Vody.

Azov fleet: Peter Bredal with a rebuilt Azov fleet, supplies and 4000 Don Cossacks, met Lacy’s army on 19 May. On 23 May more Don Cossacks arrived with their own boats. On 25 May Bredal was caught by a much larger Turkish fleet and blockaded at ‘Cape Vissarion’ (location?).  The blockade was broken when the Turks unwisely pursued 3 escaping sloops. On 6 June they were again caught at ‘Cape Fedotov’, probably on the long sand spit just east of Henichesk Strait. They hauled their boats across the sand spit and reassembled near Henichesk where they were again caught on 16 June. They landed their guns, built a shore battery and burned their boats. There was a 2-day artillery duel but the Turks chose not to land, perhaps because they lacked marines. The loss of the supply fleet forced Lacy to withdraw from Crimea.

1738: Western campaign: The goal was for Muennich to lead the main army to the Dniester and attack the border forts at either Khotin or Bender. On 17 April he crossed the Dnieper south of Poltava and in late June crossed the Bug. He reached the Dniester but on 6 August abandoned the campaign because of Turkish resistance and because of reports of plague west of the river.

1739: 4th Crimea fails, western campaign, war ends
1739: Failed invasion of Crimea: Levashev was supposed to march from Azov but an epidemic forced him to halt at the Miuss River. He later returned to Azov because a fire had destroyed the Azov arsenal and granary. Bredal could not sail from Azov because of disease and a shortage of ships. Lacy left Izium on 10 May. His force was weakened because much had been transferred to the western campaign. In July he learned that the Turks had sent troops and a fleet and that Levashev had turned back. He marched toward Perekop, saw that there was no hope and returned to the Ukrainian line, which he reached on 24 August.

1739: Western campaign: Muennich planned to capture Khotin to take pressure off the Austrians, who were doing poorly. He left Kiev in late April and crossed Polish territory because the land was better and the Poles were too weak to interfere.  He won the Battle of Stavuchany in August, took Khotin and marched south to Jassy. There he learned that Austria had signed a separate peace which made his position untenable.  On 23 September he was ordered to return to Russian territory.

1739: Treaties: The war was ended by the Treaty of Belgrade with Austria in September and the Treaty of Niš (1739) with Russia in October. All three parties wanted out because the war was costing more than anything they might gain. Russia was also worried about the looming Russo-Swedish War (1741–1743). Russia kept nothing more than a demilitarized Azov, but it had demonstrated that it could reach Moldavia and was now a serious threat to Crimea. In the next war Russia took Crimea and briefly occupied Bucharest.

Note on the Austro-Turkish war
Austria hoped to gain land in the Balkans while the Turks were tied down with Russia. The border was then about 100km south of Belgrade in land gained in 1717. In 1737 Austria went south, captured Nish but soon gave it up. In 1738 the Turks advanced and took places in Serbia and on the Danube. In 1739 Austria crossed the Danube, fought at Grocka and fell back to the Danube. Belgrade was under siege by the Turks when talks began. Austria gave up Belgrade, Serbia south of the Danube and western Wallachia which was perhaps more than the military situation required. The war was poorly managed. Next year the War of the Austrian Succession began.

References

Sources

 

Military details:Davies, Brian, Empire and Military Revolution in Eastern Europe, 2011, Chapter Five
Military maps:Amin, Agha H, Atlas of Russo Turkish Wars, Russo Turkish War 1735–39, Volume 4, no date

External links
 Chronicle of Eighteenth Century Russia

 
Conflicts in 1735
Conflicts in 1736
Conflicts in 1737
Conflicts in 1738
Conflicts in 1739
Russo-Turkish wars
1735
Military operations involving the Crimean Khanate
1730s in Europe
1735 in Europe
1739 in Europe
1730s in the Ottoman Empire
1735 in the Ottoman Empire
1739 in the Ottoman Empire
1730s in Austria
1735 in Austria
1739 in Austria
1730s in the Russian Empire
1735 in the Russian Empire
1739 in the Russian Empire
1730s in the Habsburg monarchy
1735 in the Habsburg monarchy
1739 in the Habsburg monarchy
Wars involving Wallachia
Wars involving Moldavia